Paul Dyer may refer to:

 Paul Dyer (footballer) (born 1953), English footballer
 Paul Dyer (conductor), Australian musician, conductor and artistic director